Nikolai Ivanovich Veselovsky (November 1848 - 30 March 1918) was a Russian archaeologist and orientalist.

Born in Moscow, Veselovsky went to school in Vologda, and then studied at Saint Petersburg State University. Reader in 1877, extraordinarius in 1884, ordinarius from 1890.

Veselovsky was the first to excavate Afrasiab, the oldest part of Samarkand, as well as several notable kurgans in Southern Russia and Ukraine, notably the Solokha, Kostromskaya and Maikop kurgans. Some of the finest examples of Scythian art, including the Solokha comb, were discovered by Veselovsky and his team.

References
Konovalov, Panov, Uvarov, Vologda, xxii - nachalo xx veka (1993), s.v.
Piotrovsky, Boris, et al. "Excavations and Discoveries in Scythian Lands", in From the Lands of the Scythians: Ancient Treasures from the Museums of the U.S.S.R., 3000 B.C.–100 B.C. The Metropolitan Museum of Art Bulletin, v. 32, no. 5 (1974), available online as a series of PDFs (bottom of the page).
Cловарь профессоров и преподавателей имп. СПб. ун-та. 1869- 1894, vol. 1,  1896, p. 151-152.

Russian archaeologists
Russian orientalists
Corresponding members of the Saint Petersburg Academy of Sciences
1848 births
1918 deaths